East Troy is an unincorporated community in Bradford County, Pennsylvania, United States.

Notes

Unincorporated communities in Bradford County, Pennsylvania
Unincorporated communities in Pennsylvania